Kabang (Pattani Malay: กาแบ) is the westernmost district (amphoe) of Yala province, southern Thailand.

History
The name Kabang is a Thai corruption of kabae or kabe (Jawi: كاب), its original name in Patani Malay language. Kabae or kabe is a kind of Rambutan tree.

The area of Kabang district was separated from Yaha district to create a minor district (king amphoe) on 1 April 1991.  It was upgraded to a full district on 11 October 1997.

Geography
Neighboring districts are (from the northwest clockwise): Saba Yoi of Songkhla province; Yaha of Yala province; and Kedah state of Malaysia.

Administration

Central administration 
Kabang is divided into two sub-districts (tambons), which are further subdivided into 19 administrative villages (mubans).

Local administration 
There are two sub-district administrative organizations (SAO) in the district:
 Kabang consisting of sub-district Kabang.
 Bala consisting of sub-district Bala.

References

External links
amphoe.com (Thai)

Districts of Yala province